"Turn on, tune in, drop out" is a counterculture-era phrase popularized by Timothy Leary in 1966. In 1967, Leary spoke at the Human Be-In, a gathering of 30,000 hippies in Golden Gate Park in San Francisco and phrased the famous words, "Turn on, tune in, drop out". It was also the title of his spoken word album recorded in 1966. On this lengthy album, Leary can be heard speaking in a monotone soft voice on his views about the world and humanity, describing nature, Indian symbols, "the meaning of inner life", the LSD experience, peace, and many other issues.

History of the phrase
In a 1988 interview with Neil Strauss, Leary said the slogan was "given to him" by Marshall McLuhan during a lunch in New York City. Leary added McLuhan "was very much-interested in ideas and marketing, and he started singing something like, 'Psychedelics hit the spot / Five hundred micrograms, that's a lot,' to the tune of a Pepsi commercial of the time. Then he started going, 'Tune in, turn on, and drop out. The phrase was used by Leary in a speech he delivered at the opening of a press conference in New York City on September 19, 1966. It urged people to embrace cultural changes through the use of psychedelics by detaching from the existing conventions and hierarchies in society. It was also the motto of his League for Spiritual Discovery.

In his speech, Leary said:

Leary explains in his 1983 autobiography Flashbacks:

Turn on, Tune in, Drop out is also the title of a book of essays by Timothy Leary, covering topics ranging from religion, education, and politics to Aldous Huxley, neurology, and psychedelic drugs.

In 1967, Leary (during the salon known as the Houseboat Summit) announced his agreement with a new ordering of the phrase as he said, "I would agree to change the slogan to 'Drop out. Turn on. Drop in.'"

By the early 1980s, while on a speaking tour with G. Gordon Liddy, the phrase had transformed to "turn on, tune in, take over."

During his last decade, Leary proclaimed the "PC is the LSD of the 1990s" and re-worked the phrase into "turn on, boot up, jack in" to suggest joining the cyberdelic counterculture.

See also

Eight-circuit model of consciousness

References

Psychedelia
1999 non-fiction books
Lysergic acid diethylamide
Timothy Leary
Hippie movement
1960s fads and trends
1966 neologisms